Alexander Brandon (also known as Siren in the demoscene and tracker community) is an American musician, former member of Straylight Productions, who composed music mostly for games produced by Epic Games, or games based on Epic technology, including Unreal, Unreal Tournament, Deus Ex, Tyrian, Jazz Jackrabbit 2, and the cancelled game Jazz Jackrabbit 3D. Brandon is also a voice actor, having been cast most recently for the parts of Ancano and Amaund Motierre in the Role Playing Game The Elder Scrolls V: Skyrim by Bethesda Game Studios.

Brandon started composing music at the age of 14 when he got an Ad Lib music synthesizer card for Christmas. He worked in several MOD music groups over his composing years in the late 1990s, including the Kosmic Free Music Foundation. During that time, he also composed for several musicdisks such as Return to Stage 9.

Brandon has built several audio departments, starting with Ion Storm Austin in mid-2000. This was followed with an audio director position at Midway Home Entertainment in San Diego until 2007 when he started the audio department at Obsidian Entertainment. In February 2009, he built the audio department at Heatwave Interactive, also providing business development and overall media management. In April 2010, Alex launched Funky Rustic, an independent audio production studio, working out of Georgetown, Texas.

Past nicknames
During his tracker career, Alex has used several nicknames:
 1995: first tracks released under the name "Chromatic Dragon"
 end of 1995: name changed to "Siren"
 middle of 1996, during KFMF membership: name temporarily changed to "Sandman"
 end of 1996: name changed back to "Siren"

Note that there were several (two or three) tracker musicians around the world, who have used the nickname "Sandman" independently of Alex.

Influences
Alexander Brandon's influences include Peter Gabriel, Dream Theater, Frost*, Andrew Sega, Steve Vai, and Ozric Tentacles, among others.

Personal life
Brandon lives in Georgetown, Texas with his family.

Works

Video games

Other work

Voice acting

Books

References

External links
Developer Bio at Gamasutra
Developer Bio at MobyGames
Musicography and tracks collection for 1995–1999 (Chromatic Dragon / Siren period)
Musicography for 1995–2002 (incomplete)

Artist profile at OverClocked ReMix

Interviews
"Interview with Alexander Brandon". MotherShip Server: Kemmerer, Peter (June 1999)
"Interview with Alex Brandon". DeusEx-Machina.com: (Jan. 2001)
"Alexander Brandon Interview: Going Solo". Game Music Online (November 1, 2007)
"Epic Composer Interview: Alexander Brandon". Epic Games (May 16, 2012, archived)
"PC classic commentary: Tyrian 2000 with Alexander Brandon". PC Gamer (July 3, 2014)

American electronic musicians
American male voice actors
Demosceners
Living people
Place of birth missing (living people)
Tracker musicians
Video game composers
People from Georgetown, Texas
1974 births